Vector Pascal is an open source compiler that extends the Pascal  programming language. It is designed to support efficient expression of algorithms using the SIMD model of computation. It imports into Pascal abstraction mechanisms derived from Iverson's APL programming language. In particular it extends all operators to work on vectors of data. The type system is also extended to handle pixels and dimensional analysis.

The compiler is implemented in Java.

Supported architectures 

 Intel 486
 Intel Xeon-Phi (auto parallelising Xeon Phi compile)
 AMD Opteron processor, the Opteron compiler supports multi-core parallelism
 Pentium 4
 Athlon
 Sony PlayStation 2 Emotion Engine  
 The Cell processor (PS3)
 Advanced Vector Extensions (Intel Sandy Bridge, AMD Bulldozer (microarchitecture))

Standards 

The syntax generally follows that of Turbo Pascal and includes all features of the ISO standard (ISO 7185-1990) except where overridden by Turbo Pascal. Features of Extended Pascal (an extended Pascal standard was created as ISO/IEC 10206) are also incorporated.

References

External links
Reference Manual in SIGPLAN Notices
Orthogonal Parallel Processing in Vector Pascal

Pascal (programming language)
Pascal programming language family
Pascal (programming language) compilers
Array programming languages